Mawhati is one of the 60 Legislative Assembly constituencies of Meghalaya state in India. It is part of Ri Bhoi district and is reserved for candidates belonging to the Scheduled Tribes. It falls under Shillong Lok Sabha constituency and its current MLA is Dasakhiatbha Lamare of the National People's Party.

Members of Legislative Assembly
Source:

|-style="background:#E9E9E9;"
!Year
!colspan="2" align="center"|Party
!align="center" |MLA
!Votes
|-
|1972
|bgcolor="#DDDDDD"|
|align="left"| Independent
|align="left"| Martin Narayan Majaw
|1521 
|-
|1978
|bgcolor="#DDDDDD"|
|align="left"| Independent
|align="left"| Martin Narayan Majaw
|2412
|-
|1983
|bgcolor=blue|
|align="left"| Hill State People's Democratic Party
|align="left"| S. R. Moksha 
|4216
|-
|1988
|bgcolor="#CEF2E0"|
|align="left"| Hill People's Union
|align="left"| S. R. Moksha 
|3550 
|-
|1993
|bgcolor="#CEF2E0"|
|align="left"| Hill People's Union
|align="left"| S. R. Moksha 
|5013
|-
|1998 
|bgcolor="#00FFFF"|
|align="left"| Indian National Congress
|align="left"| Phingwell Muktieh
|3941 
|-
|2003
|bgcolor="#00FFFF"|
|align="left"| Indian National Congress
|align="left"| Phingwell Muktieh
|5021 
|-
|2008 
|bgcolor="#CEF2E0"|
|align="left"| United Democratic Party
|align="left"| Donbok Khymdeit
|6112 
|-
|2013
|bgcolor="#DDDDDD"|
|align="left"| Independent
|align="left"| Julias Kitbok Dorphang 
|8246 
|-
|2018
|bgcolor="#DB7093"|
|align="left"| National People's Party
|align="left"| Dasakhiatbha Lamare
|6365 
|}

Election results

2018

See also
List of constituencies of the Meghalaya Legislative Assembly
Ri Bhoi district
Shillong (Lok Sabha constituency)

References

Assembly constituencies of Meghalaya
Ri-Bhoi district